The NetSCID-5 is an online version of the Structured Clinical Interview for DSM-5, developed and marketed in consultation with the SCID-5 authors by TeleSage, Inc. in Chapel Hill, North Carolina.
	
NetSCID-5 is offered as an online service with user accounts and payment per-administration.  Diagnoses and response data are made available in the form of reports and raw data download.  
	
TeleSage currently offers the NetSCID-5 in Research, Clinician, and Personality Disorders versions.  The content (e.g. text, branching and scoring) of each of these instruments is intended to match the corresponding paper version.

Initial development was funded by a grant from the National Institute of Mental Health.  Public availability was announced June 30, 2017.

Acceptance 
	The NetSCID-5 has been used in clinical studies, such as: 
 Lithium treatment for bipolar disorder vs healthy subjects
 Comorbidities with emetophobia
 Heart failure multimorbidities
	
Training on the use of the NetSCID-5 has been offered by independent organizations.

Experience with NetSCID-5 has been listed as a qualification in job postings.

Computerized versions of mental health interviews has been suggested by some research to result in fewer branching and scoring errors compared to pencil-and-paper versions of the same instruments.

Competitors 
An electronic versions of the SCID-5 instrument is also offered with eInterview from Sunilion Software

References

External links 
 APA - The Structured Clinical Interview for DSM-5® - American Psychiatric Association Publishing
 NetSCID-5 - TeleSage, Inc.
 Home Page - Sunilion Software - Sunilion Software

Diagnostic and Statistical Manual of Mental Disorders
Mental disorders screening and assessment tools